The 2017–18 Regionalliga was the tenth season of the Regionalliga, the sixth under the new format, as the fourth tier of the German football league system.

Regionalliga Nord
18 teams from the states of Bremen, Hamburg, Lower Saxony and Schleswig-Holstein competed in the sixth season of the reformed Regionalliga Nord; 15 teams were retained from last season and 3 were promoted from the Oberliga, namely 2016–17 Niedersachsenliga champions SSV Jeddeloh and promotion round winners Eutin 08, 2016–17 Schleswig-Holstein-Liga champions, and Altona 93, 2016–17 Oberliga Hamburg champions. The season started on 28 July 2017.

Regionalliga Nordost
18 teams from the states of Berlin, Brandenburg, Mecklenburg-Vorpommern, Saxony and Thuringia competed in the sixth season of the reformed Regionalliga Nordost; 15 teams were retained from last season and 3 teams were promoted from the Oberliga. VSG Altglienicke were promoted from 2016–17 NOFV-Oberliga Nord and BSG Chemie Leipzig from 2016–17 NOFV-Oberliga Süd. A play-off was held between the two leagues' runners-up, Optik Rathenow and Germania Halberstadt, to determine the last participant. Halberstadt won the play-off on aggregate and were promoted. The season started on 29 July 2017.

Regionalliga West
18 teams from North Rhine-Westphalia competed in the sixth season of the reformed Regionalliga West; 14 teams were retained from last season and 4 were promoted from the Oberliga. SC Paderborn were originally relegated from the 2016–17 3. Liga, but retained their place in 3. Liga following 1860 Munich's failure to obtain a license for the 2017–18 3. Liga. KFC Uerdingen were promoted from the 2016–17 Oberliga Niederrhein, TuS Erndtebrück and Westfalia Rhynern from the 2016–17 Oberliga Westfalen and FC Wegberg-Beeck from the 2016–17 Oberliga Mittelrhein. The season started on 28 July 2017.

Westphalia DFB-Pokal play-off
As the Westphalian Football and Athletics Association is one of three regional associations with the most participating teams in their league competitions, they were allowed to enter a second team for the 2018–19 DFB-Pokal (in addition to the Westphalian Cup winners). A play-off took place between the best-placed eligible (non-reserve) Westphalian team of the Regionalliga West, SV Rödinghausen, and the best-placed eligible team of the Oberliga Westfalen, SV Lippstadt, with the winners qualifying for the DFB-Pokal.

Regionalliga Südwest
19 teams from Baden-Württemberg, Hesse, Rhineland-Palatinate and Saarland competed in the sixth season of the Regionalliga Südwest; 13 teams were retained from last season and 4 were promoted from the Oberliga. Mainz 05 II and FSV Frankfurt were relegated from the 2016–17 3. Liga. Schott Mainz were promoted from the 2016–17 Oberliga Rheinland-Pfalz/Saar, Eintracht Stadtallendorf from the 2016–17 Hessenliga and SC Freiburg II from the 2016–17 Oberliga Baden-Württemberg. The runners-up of the other Oberligas had a play-off round which was won by Röchling Völklingen. The Chinese under-20 national team was about to participate in this season from November onwards to even out the fixture list, but the Chinese withdrew after one game following protests from pro-Tibet demonstrators. Accordingly, their participation was cancelled. The season started on 28 July 2017.

Regionalliga Bayern
19 teams from Bavaria competed in the sixth season of the Regionalliga Bayern; 14 teams were retained from last season and 3 were promoted from the Bayernliga. FC Unterföhring were promoted from the Bayernliga Süd and VfB Eichstätt from the Bayernliga Nord. FC Pipinsried were also promoted as they beat Greuther Fürth II in the 2016–17 Bayernliga promotion play-off. Finally, in a play-off between the two losing teams, Greuther Fürth II beat Viktoria Aschaffenburg, obtaining the last open spot in the league. 1860 Munich were originally relegated from 2016–17 2. Bundesliga to 2017–18 3. Liga, but failed to obtain a license and therefore competed in the Regionalliga. This meant that this year's league was held with 19 teams instead of 18.

Relegation play-offs
The 16th and 17th placed teams from the Regionalliga play against the runners-up from the two Bayernliga divisions for two places in the next Regionalliga season.

|}

Promotion play-offs
The draw for the 2017–18 promotion play-offs was held on 7 April, with another draw between the Regionalliga Südwest teams held on 27 April 2018.

Summary
The first legs were played on 24 May, and the second legs were played on 27 May 2018.

|}

Matches
All times Central European Summer Time (UTC+2)

1860 Munich won 5–4 on aggregate.

Energie Cottbus won 3–2 on aggregate.

KFC Uerdingen won 3–0 on aggregate.

Notes

References

External links
 Regionalliga   DFB.de
 Regionalliga Nord  nordfv.de
 Regionalliga West  wdfv.de
 Regionalliga Bayern   bfv.de

2017-18
4
2017–18 in European fourth tier association football leagues